A civilization or civilisation is a complex society

Civilization may also refer to:

Film and television
 Civilization (film), a 1916 film
 Civilisation (TV series), a 1969 documentary series by Kenneth Clark
 Civilisations (TV series), a 2018 sequel to the 1969 series
 "Civilization" (Star Trek: Enterprise), a 2001 episode of Star Trek: Enterprise
 Civilization: Is the West History?, a 2011 British TV documentary

Games
 Civilization (1980 board game), a game by Francis Tresham
 Civilization (2002 board game) or Sid Meier's Civilization: The Boardgame, a game by Glenn Drover
 Civilization (2010 board game) or Sid Meier's Civilization: The Board Game, a game by Kevin Wilson
 Civilization: A New Dawn, a 2017 board game by James Kniffen
 Civilization (series), a series of video games
 Civilization (video game), a 1991 computer game by Sid Meier

Music
 Civilization (album), a 2004 album by Front Line Assembly
 Civilisation, a compilation album by Kero Kero Bonito
 Civilisation I (2019), the first EP in the project
 Civilisation II (2021), the second EP in the project
 "Civilization" (1947 song), a song by Carl Sigman
 "Civilization" (Justice song), 2011

Other uses
 Civilization (novel), a 1994 novel by Paul Quarrington
 Civilizations (novel), a 2019 novel by French author Laurent Binet

See also
 Community, a social unit which shares commonality 
 Society, individuals that interact with each other
 Advanced Civilization, a 1991 board game expansion by Lauren Banerd
 Civilized (album), third and final album by indie rock band Stellastarr
 Uncivilised (film), a 1936 Australian film directed by Charles Chauvel